Shree Karthick is an Indian film director and screenwriter who works primarily in Tamil cinema. Karthick directed a number of short films and commercials before venturing into the feature films with his directorial debut being Oke Oka Jeevitham, a bilingual starring Sharwanand and produced by Dream Warrior Pictures.

Early life 
Shree Karthick was born in Chennai to a Telugu mother and a Tamil father. He did his schooling from SBOA Matriculation School and subsequently, his B.Tech, in Computer Science Engineering, from SRM Valliammai Engineering College.

Shree Karthick married Sinduja Ramanan in Chennai on 28 June 2017.

Career

2007–2018: Early career 
Shree Karthick started off his dance career with a dance company based out of Chennai, which he had joined at a young age. He credits his passion for dance with helping in the overall development of his filmmaking skills. He became a senior company dancer there and began teaching other students. Upon graduating from there, he left to pursue his engineering degree. In his first year, a dance reality show Attam Pattam was announced, to be aired on Kalaignar TV. Karthick decided to participate and earned great appraisal from the judges for his expressive style of dance before eventually becoming the title winner. He then received an offer from another dance reality show Jodi Number One, and was a semi-finalist in the same.

Following the judges' advice about his expressive style, he decided to give acting a shot. Shree did supporting roles in a few movies like Arrambam (2013) and  Yagavarayinum Naa Kaakka (2015) before realizing his interest for writing and subsequently moving onto screenwriting and filmmaking. He began working on stories and scripts, aiming to turn them into short films and motion pictures.

In 2013, Shree Karthick, along with Dev, founded Madboys Creatives, a media company focused on creating commercials, digital films and web-series.

Shree Karthick ventured into filmmaking with his short film debut Vyugam, starring Dev, which was well received by critics and audience alike. Following the success of Vyugam, he then went on to create Happy To Be Single, the first-ever Tamil web series, later distributed by Sony Music as well as Childhood Diaries, another award-winning short film.

2019–present: Film debut 
Shree Karthick is often credited for the introduction of the nascent concept of web-series to Tamil cinema, with the release of Happy To Be Single.

In 2019, Shree Karthick's directorial feature-film debut Oke Oka Jeevitham (titled Kanam in Tamil) was announced, produced by Dream Warrior Pictures and starring Sharwanand, Amala Akkineni and Ritu Varma. Amidst the pandemic, he also created and produced I Hate You - I Love You under the banner of his content studio Madboys Entertainment. A few episodes were written and directed by him.

Filmography

Television 

 All works are in Tamil

References

External links 
 



1988 births
Living people
Tamil film directors
Tamil-language film directors
Tamil screenwriters
21st-century Indian film directors
Telugu film directors
Film directors from Chennai
Telugu people
Telugu screenwriters